Multi-Edit is a commercial text editor for Microsoft Windows created in the 1980s by Todd Johnson. Multi Edit Software obtained ownership rights for the product in October 2002.  Multi-Edit contains tools for programmers, including macros, configurable syntax highlighting, code folding, file type conversions, project management, regular expressions, three block highlight modes including column, stream and line modes, remote editing of files via FTP and interfaces for APIs or command lines of choice. The editor uses a tabbed document interface and sessions can be saved.

Multi-Edit was originally written in Pascal and was built to run in MS-DOS and has since been ported to Windows. The most recent release is dated from 2008. No compatibility information for Windows versions after Windows 7 is available from the product's website.

HTML editing features include:
 Integration with CSE HTML Validator for offline HTML, XHTML and CSS checking
 HTML toolbar preconfigured for popular functions and HTML tags
 Customization of languages, templates, menus, toolbars and the UI with its CMac macro language

Multi-Edit is a shareware product. It can be evaluated for free for 30 days, after which the user must purchase a license to continue using the software.

Note: As of August 2022, the Multi-Edit website, including all of the forums, is off-line and not accessible.

Features
Multi-Edit also has the following features:
 Open and edit large files
 Column/Stream/Line (block) mode editing
 Regular expression find and replace
 Find/Replace in Files
 Extensible code highlighting, with 'wordfiles' already available for many languages
 Code collapsing and hierarchical function listing
 Beautify and reformat source code
 Smart templates for code completion
 Hex viewing
 File/data sorting
 Project management
 Sessions
 Bookmarking
 Automation via macros and scripts
 Integrated file comparison
 Includes BCDiffer a built-in File Compare Utility created by Scooter Software

History
Multi-Edit was developed by Todd M. Johnson as a source code editor, at a time when the only other popular source code editor for MS-DOS was Brief. As a DOS editor it offered features such as user-configurable syntax highlighting for language-specific color coding of keywords and symbols. Even after the appearance of integrated development environments in the mid-1990s, it remained popular for features such as its macro language, easy customization, and multiple language support. As of 2011, it was one of the few surviving editors from the 1990s era when text editors were regarded as indispensable programming tools.

See also
 List of text editors
 Comparison of text editors

References

Further reading

External links
 Official MultiEdit website

Windows text editors
Windows-only shareware
DOS text editors
Code navigation tools